Holmberg 15A (abbreviated to Holm 15A) is a supergiant elliptical galaxy and the central dominant galaxy of the Abell 85 galaxy cluster in the constellation Cetus, about 700 million light-years from Earth. It was discovered  by Erik Holmberg. It became well known when it was reported to have the largest core ever observed in a galaxy, spanning some 15,000 light years, however this was subsequently refuted.

Supermassive black hole 

It has been postulated that the primary component of the galactic core is a supermassive black hole with a mass of 40 billion solar masses, although no direct measurement has yet been made. Previous estimates by Lauer et al. have jointed a mass value as high as 310 billion  using the gamma ray point break radius method. Kormendy and Bender gave a value of 260 billion  in a 2009 paper. Lower estimates were given by Kormendy and Ho et al. in 2013 at 2.1 and 9.2 billion . The paper by Lopez-Cruz et al. stated: "Therefore, we conservatively suggest that Holm 15A hosts an SMBH with a mass of ~1 ." Kormendy and Ho et al derived these equations using the M–sigma relation and the size of the outer bulge of the galaxy, which are indirect estimates. Rusli et al derived a value of 170 billion  using break radius methodology. In addition, Abell 85 has its velocity dispersion of dark matter halo at ~750 km/s, which could only be explained by a black hole with a mass greater than 150 billion , although Kormendy and Ho et al stated that "dark matter halos are scale-free, and the SMBH-dark matter coevolution is independent from the effects of baryons". This makes it one of the most massive black holes ever discovered, with it being classified as an ultramassive black hole.

See also 
 List of galaxies

References 

Supermassive black holes
Cetus (constellation)
Elliptical galaxies
002501
Astronomical objects discovered in 1937